Ventasso is a comune (municipality) in the Province of Reggio Emilia in the Italian region Emilia-Romagna.

It was established on 1 January 2016 by the merger of the municipalities of Busana, Collagna, Ligonchio and Ramiseto.

References

Cities and towns in Emilia-Romagna